Márcio de Azevedo (born 23 September 1969), known as Márcio Goiano, is a Brazilian football coach and former player who played as a defender. He is the current head coach of Central.

Honours

Club honours
 Goiás 
 Campeonato Goiano: 1994, 1996

 Sport
 Campeonato Pernambucano: 1997, 1998, 1999

 Figueirense
 Campeonato Catarinense: 2002, 2003

 Fortaleza
 Campeonato Cearense: 2005

References 

1971 births
Living people
Sportspeople from Goiânia
Brazilian footballers
Brazilian football managers
Campeonato Brasileiro Série A players
Campeonato Brasileiro Série B players
Campeonato Brasileiro Série B managers
Campeonato Brasileiro Série C managers
Goiás Esporte Clube players
Sport Club do Recife players
Clube Atlético Mineiro players
Associação Portuguesa de Desportos players
Figueirense FC players
Fortaleza Esporte Clube players
Avaí FC players
Figueirense FC managers
Grêmio Barueri Futebol managers
Associação Desportiva São Caetano managers
Goiás Esporte Clube managers
Criciúma Esporte Clube managers
Red Bull Brasil managers
ABC Futebol Clube managers
Clube de Regatas Brasil managers
Mogi Mirim Esporte Clube managers
Vila Nova Futebol Clube managers
Cuiabá Esporte Clube managers
Associação Atlética Aparecidense managers
Clube Náutico Capibaribe managers
Ríver Atlético Clube managers
Association football defenders
Central Sport Club managers